Massachusetts College of Pharmacy and Health Sciences (MCPHS) is a private university focused on medical and health-related science programs and located in Boston, Massachusetts. The university provides traditional and accelerated programs of study focused on professional education in pharmacy and the health sciences. Since 2000, MCPHS has expanded to include two additional campuses, located in Worcester, Massachusetts, and Manchester, New Hampshire.

History
MCPHS was founded by fourteen Boston pharmacists as the Massachusetts College of Pharmacy in 1823 and is the oldest higher education institution in Boston. It is also the second-oldest and largest college of pharmacy in the United States, preceded only by the Philadelphia College of Pharmacy (Now the Philadelphia College of Pharmacy’s Doctor of Pharmacy program at Saint Joseph’s University), established in 1821. In 1825, the University published the First American Pharmaceutical Library Catalogue, detailing the effects of many pharmaceutical products. In 1852, the University obtained a charter from the Great Court of the Commonwealth of Massachusetts to award its first formal degree.

In 1918, the University built the George Robert White Building in the Longwood Medical Area in Boston, across from Harvard Medical School to serve as its main campus. In 1979, The General Court of the Commonwealth of Massachusetts approved a reform in the charter of the University to permit degree awarding authority in the allied health sciences, and the University formally changed its name to the Massachusetts College of Pharmacy and Allied Health Sciences.

The institution would later shorten its name to Massachusetts College of Pharmacy and Health Sciences (MCPHS). MCPHS added a campus in Worcester, Massachusetts in 2000 and an expanded campus in Manchester, New Hampshire in 2002. Also in 2002, MCPHS has obtained and integrated the Forsyth School of Dental Hygienists into the University by introducing an Oral Hygiene Course. During this period, MCPHS grew to include a School of Pharmacy, a School of Physician Assistant Studies, a School of Optometry, a School of Physical Therapy, a School of Arts and Sciences, School of Nursing, a School of Dental Hygiene, and a School of Medical Imaging and Therapeutics, School of Healthcare Business, School of Occupational Therapy, and School of Acupuncture.

In the spring of 2013, the institution legally modified its name to MCPHS University to represent this growth and the variety of programs it provides while retaining its acronym "MCPHS." In April 2016, MCPHS acquired the New England School of Acupuncture (NESA).

In 2017, the school was dealing with overcrowding after a surge in enrollment. In 2018, MCPHS added new residence halls and did extensive renovations. In 2019 the school received an award for restoring the Duncan and Goodell Building at 34 Mechanic Street in Worcester and also added the School of Professional Studies.

Campuses

Boston
The Boston MCPHS campus is based at 179 Longwood Avenue, in the Longwood Medical and Academic Area. It is next to the Massachusetts College of Art and Design and Harvard Medical School, and near health care institutions such as Boston Children's Hospital, Dana–Farber Cancer Institute, Brigham and Women's Hospital, and Beth Israel Deaconess Medical Center. The Boston campus consists of three major buildings: the George Robert White Building, the Ronald A. Matricaria Academic and Student Center and the John Richard Fennell Building, which are all structurally integrated with the student dormitories.

The Richard E. Griffin Academic Center, a fourth building, opened in January 2009 to house the University's School of Nursing, School of Physician Assistant Studies, School of Medical Imaging and Therapeutics, Center for Professional Career Development, and University Development. The six-story, triangular structure comprises approximately 50,000 square feet (4,600 m2) of classrooms, faculty and personnel offices, and labs for patient examination and clinical simulation teaching. The building also has a computing and education centre, and an auditorium with 230 seats.

The MCPHS testing laboratories are designed for each of the specialty academic fields. There are such specialist laboratories as a radioisotope testing collection, a product development laboratory equipped for drug production designed for medicinal tableting, coating and encapsulation and a facility to manufacture liquids, ointments, and sterile cosmetic products. Instruments available include infrared, ultraviolet, and nuclear magnetic resonance spectrometers, gas chromatographs, and high-pressure liquid chromatographs. Facilities for machine and animal testing are accessible too. Additionally, services for testing equipment, although not accessible on site, are accessible via clinical and academic affiliations with other universities in the  Greater Boston/Cambridge region.

Worcester

Located at 19, 25, 40 Foster Street, 28 Mechanics Street, 19 Norwich Street, and 10 Lincoln Square in Downtown Worcester, Massachusetts, MCPHS' Worcester campus houses the institution's accelerated programs in Nursing, Family Nurse Practitioner, Dental Hygiene, Diagnostic Medical Sonography, and Doctor of Pharmacy as well as the Master of Physician Assistant Studies program, two Master of Acupuncture programs, Doctor of Physical Therapy program, and the Doctor of Optometry program, for post-baccalaureate students.

MCPHS Worcester is composed of three main buildings that are known collectively as The Thomas Henry Borysek Living and Learning Center. The Thomas Henry Borysek Living and Learning Center houses administrative and faculty offices, conference rooms, classrooms, a technology center, patient assessment and clinical simulation laboratories, and six floors of suite-style student housing (all with private bedrooms). The basement provides comfortable group study/social (lounge) space for students. A portion of the ninth floor also houses a spacious room, the Fuller Conference Room, designed for conferences, board meetings, receptions and other University gatherings.

On September 21, 2009, MCPHS officially opened a new academic center in downtown Worcester, the Maher Academic Building at 40 Foster Street. The building houses 30,000 square feet of academic and student space. Two 250-seat auditoria and three "smart" classrooms feature interactive technology. The street-level multipurpose laboratory includes a model pharmacy that simulates community and institutional practice environments. There is also a student lounge, student meeting rooms, quiet study areas, and faculty offices.

In mid-June 2010, MCPHS acquired the property at 10 Lincoln Square (formerly the Crowne Plaza Hotel). This 250,000-square-foot building offers furnished rooms, parking, a fitness center, dining hall, outdoor patio, and green space. It is also home to two clinics open to the public: the Eye and Vision Center and the Forsyth Dental Hygiene Clinic.

The 28 Mechanic Street building is home to MCPHS Online, which was formed in 2011. This physical facility houses the MCPHS Online staff members charged with the development and oversight of MCPHS Online programs.

The New England School of Acupuncture treatment center and programs are housed in the 19 Norwich Street building.

Manchester
The MCPHS Manchester, New Hampshire campus is located at 1260 Elm Street in downtown Manchester. In similar format to that of Worcester, the MCPHS Manchester campus offers accelerated programs in Nursing and Doctor of Pharmacy, as well as a Master of Occupational Therapy program and Master of Physician Assistant Studies for post-baccalaureate students. The  campus building holds the school's library, classrooms, laboratories, seminar rooms, administrative offices, and student space. Many of the Manchester classrooms are equipped for video conferencing with Worcester classrooms.

Academics
MCPHS is composed of fifteen distinct schools: 
 New England School of Acupuncture
 Forsyth School of Dental Hygiene
 School of Arts and Sciences
 School of Healthcare Business
 School of Medical Imaging and Therapeutics
 School of Nursing - Boston
 School of Nursing - Worcester/Manchester 
 School of Occupational Therapy - Worcester/Manchester 
 School of Optometry
 School of Pharmacy – Boston
 School of Pharmacy – Worcester/Manchester
 School of Physical Therapy
 School of Physician Assistant Studies – Boston
 School of Physician Assistant Studies – Worcester/Manchester
 School of Professional Studies

In 2016, the New England School of Acupuncture (NESA) combined with MCPHS's Worcester campus. The NESA was established in 1974, making it the oldest acupuncture school in the United States.

College relations

MCPHS Boston is a member of the Colleges of the Fenway, a collegiate consortium in the Longwood Medical and Academic Area. The association promotes collaboration between local schools, both academically and with buildings. The consortium includes MCPHS, Emmanuel College, MassArt, Simmons, and Wentworth Institute of Technology. Students are able to cross register between institutions and participate in shared social events planned by the Colleges of the Fenway and various groups throughout the campus. Students may also live at either their school of attendance, or in the campus dormitories of the other member schools.  Collectively, the colleges represent more than 12,000 undergraduate students, comprising 16.2% of the total Boston population of undergraduates attending four-year colleges, or around 700 full-time faculty and 2,300 course offerings.

MCPHS Worcester is a member of the Colleges of Worcester Consortium, a collaboration of twelve academic institutions which work to further the individual missions of the member institutions while advancing higher education in the region.

MCPHS has partnerships with a variety of medical institutions to supplement its educational programs in the Premedical and Health Studies. Educational instruction may be provided by institutions such as Ross University School of Medicine for general medicine and Ross University School of Veterinary Medicine for veterinary medicine, Lake Erie College of Osteopathic Medicine for Dental Medicine, Lake Erie College of Osteopathic Medicine for Osteopathic Medicine, and A. T. Still University for Osteopathic Medicine.

International relations

MCPHS has expanded its international programs. At one point, there were 930 international students from 65 different countries on the university's three campuses, representing 13% of overall enrollment.  37 full-time MCPHS faculty hold degrees from universities outside the United States, representing 25 different countries on 6 continents.  Many faculty are engaged in international projects through the Center for International Studies and the International Center for Pharmaceutical Economics and Policy.

MCPHS has affiliation agreements with universities and clinical sites in Belize, Bolivia, China, Cuba, Dominica, Ireland, Japan, Korea, Kuwait, Peru, St. Kitts, Saudi Arabia, Taiwan and Turkey that have produced faculty and student exchanges, international conferences and service learning opportunities.

The University's Center for International Studies (CIS) is a network of individuals and departments that provides services to international students and to US students seeking educational and professional opportunities abroad. The Center focuses on student success and global engagement.

MCPHS partners with the Colleges of the Fenway Global Education Opportunity Center (GEO Center) to provide students with opportunities to study and travel abroad.

References

External links
 Official website

Medical education in the United States
Health in Massachusetts
Educational institutions established in 1823
Pharmacy schools in Massachusetts
Universities and colleges in Boston
Universities and colleges in Worcester, Massachusetts 
Universities and colleges in Hillsborough County, New Hampshire 
1823 establishments in Massachusetts
Private universities and colleges in Massachusetts
Private universities and colleges in New Hampshire